Me & Chet is the title of the follow-up to Me & Jerry, the successful duet recording by Chet Atkins and Jerry Reed. It was nominated for the 1972 Grammy Award for Best Country Instrumental Performance but did not win. Chet's solo release Chet Atkins Picks on the Hits was also nominated in the same category. It reached No. 24 on the Billboard Country Album charts.

Reissues 
 In 1998, Me & Jerry and Me & Chet were reissued on CD by One Way Records.

Track listing

Side one 
 "Jerry’s Breakdown" (Jerry Reed) – 2:09
 "Limehouse Blues" (Philip Braham, Douglas Furber) – 2:34
 "Liebestraum" (Franz Liszt) – 2:41
 "Serenade to Summertime" (Sergio Palito) – 2:33
 "Nashtown Ville" (Atkins) – 2:04

Side two 
 "Mystery Train" (Junior Parker, Sam Phillips) – 2:49
 "The Mad Russian" (Jerry Reed, Paul Yandell) – 2:13
 "Flying South" (Cindy Walker) – 2:32
 "Good Stuff" (Reed) – 2:42
 "All I Ever Need is You" (Jimmy Holiday, Eddie Reeves) – 2:05
 "I Saw the Light" (Hank Williams) – 3:20

Personnel 
 Chet Atkins – guitar
 Jerry Reed – guitar
Henry Strzelecki – bass 
Stephen Schaffer – bass
Jimmy Isbell – drums
Ralph Gallant – drums
Paul Yandell – guitar
Floyd Cramer – piano
Ray Butts – engineer
Tom Pick – engineer

References 

1972 albums
Chet Atkins albums
Jerry Reed albums
RCA Records albums